Events from the year 1783 in Sweden

Incumbents
 Monarch – Gustav III

Events
 
 
 - Creation of the Walhalla-orden
 - Treaty of Amity and Commerce (United States–Sweden)
 June - Gustav III has plans to conquer the Danish province of Norway, and meet with Catherine the Great in Finland in an unsuccessful attempt to persuade her to end the Russian-Danish alliance. 
 - Norrköping jungfrustift is founded. 
 27 September - Gustav III begun his trip to Italy and France.   
 - Bacchi Tempel, by Carl Michael Bellman
 - Giovanna Bassi is engaged at the Royal Swedish Opera in Stockholm.

Births
 
 12 January - Erik Gustaf Geijer, writer (died 1847)
 
 
 3 September - Sophie Karsten, ballerina (died 1862)
 22 October - Maria Johanna Görtz, artist (died 1853)
 18 December - Johan Niclas Byström, sculptor  (died 1848)

Deaths
 
 Brita Ryy, educator  (born 1725) 
 26 May – Anna Maria Hilfeling, miniaturist  (born 1713)
 date unknown - Maria Katarina Öhrn, opera singer and actress (born 1756)
 1 November - Carl Linnaeus the Younger, naturalist (born 1741)
 Helena Escholin, vicar's wife  (born 1713)
 Françoise-Éléonore Villain, actor (born 1761)

References

 
Years of the 18th century in Sweden